Fuchsia campos-portoi is a plant of the genus Fuchsia native to Brazil.

References

External links
 
 

campos-portoi
Flora of Brazil